Clifford Marion "Cliff" Hodge (born February 3, 1988) is a Filipino-American basketball player for the Meralco Bolts of the Philippine Basketball Association (PBA). He was selected 4th overall by the Meralco Bolts in the 2012 PBA draft.

Professional career
Hodge applied for the 2012 PBA Draft, where he was taken by the Meralco Bolts. In his debut against the Talk N' Text Tropang Texters, he had 19 points, 8 rebounds, 3 assists and 1 steal in 44 minutes. His first win came against the Alaska Aces, in which he scored 12 of his 20 points in the 3rd quarter. In their next game, he had 13 points, six rebounds, four assists, four blocks, and two steals as the Bolts claimed the win over Barangay Ginebra San Miguel. For those performances, he was named Player of the Week. He had 9 rebounds to go with 13 points in their rematch with the Aces. He finished the Philippine Cup with averages of 10.6 points, 7.4 rebounds and 1.1 blocks in 30 minutes of play. That season, he competed in the Slam Dunk Contest during the 2013 All-Star Weekend, losing to Chris Ellis. In the Governors' Cup, he had a career-high 24 points and 13 rebounds against Air21 Express. He was also in the running for Rookie of the Year, but lost to Calvin Abueva.

In 2014, Hodge competed in that year's Slam Dunk Contest, but had the lowest score among all contestants. At the end of Game Two of their Commissioner's Cup quarterfinal series against the Rain or Shine Elasto Painters, Hodge committed a close-fisted foul against Raymond Almazan. For that foul, opposing coach Yeng Guiao used a racial slur on him. The league fined Guiao P100,000 and Hodge P20,000 for their actions. The Bolts lost Game 3 and were eliminated.

In the 2016 Commissioner's Cup, Hodge had 25 points and 11 rebounds to prevent the Mahindra Enforcers from getting the win. In Game 4 of the Bolts' semifinals against TnT in the Governors' Cup, he had a career-high 32 points in 46 minutes, shooting 12-of-19 from the field. Along with his 4 rebounds, he also hit a three that guaranteed Meralco its first trip to the Finals. In the Finals, they lost to Ginebra in six games.

During the 2016–17 Philippine Cup, Hodge was penalized P20,000 after the flagrant foul he committed against Alex Cabagnot in the Bolts' match against the Beermen. He had 16 boards and 17 points against Rain or Shine to keep Meralco's playoff hopes alive. The Bolts missed out on the playoffs, winning only three times the entire conference. He was sidelined for three games during the Commissioner's Cup with a calf injury. In the Governors' Cup, he was injured with a severe ankle sprain, forcing him to miss several games. In his second game following the injury, he had 15 points on 6-of-9 shooting and 7 boards in almost 34 minutes of play against the Star Hotshots. They lost once again in the Finals to Ginebra.

Hodge missed some games during the 2017–18 Philippine Cup due to bone spurs, but returned in a win against the Kia Picanto despite needing two more weeks of rest. He left their game against the Phoenix Fuel Masters due to a knee injury. The injury was later revealed to be a MCL sprain, forcing him to miss the rest of the conference. In the Governors' Cup, he suffered a herniated disc. 

During the 2021 Philippine Cup, Hodge, along with teammate Chris Newsome, was placed into the league's health and safety protocols, forcing them to miss two games.

Personal life
Hodge was born and raised Pensacola, Florida. His father is American while his mother is Filipino. He is married to Beatrice Yao.

Hodge is an animal lover. Together with his family, they own Bark Central, an indoor dog park and cafe.

PBA career statistics

As of the end of 2021 season

Season-by-season averages

|-
| align=left | 
| align=left | Meralco
| 47 || 26.8 || .403 || .243 || .552 || 6.4 || 1.0 || .8 || .8 || 9.7
|-
| align=left | 
| align=left | Meralco
| 30 || 31.3 || .401 || .294 || .627 || 7.3 || 1.4 || .9 || .9 || 10.7
|-
| align=left | 
| align=left | Meralco
| 40 || 34.0 || .425 || .211 || .492 || 8.1 || 1.9 || .9 || 1.4 || 9.4
|-
| align=left | 
| align=left | Meralco
| 51 || 33.9 || .414 || .311 || .582 || 7.6 || 2.0 || .6 || .8 || 11.5
|-
| align=left | 
| align=left | Meralco
| 43 || 30.6 || .443 || .281 || .518 || 6.5 || 2.2 || .7 || .8 || 8.4
|-
| align=left | 
| align=left | Meralco
| 31 || 27.3 || .500 || .208 || .510 || 5.4 || 1.8 || .7 || .5 || 6.8
|-
| align=left | 
| align=left | Meralco
| 39 || 25.4 || .402 || .100 || .553 || 5.7 || 1.8 || .7 || .4 || 5.3
|-
| align=left | 
| align=left | Meralco
| 18 || 33.1 || .605 || .000 || .571 || 6.2 || 2.2 || .7 || .8 || 9.8
|-
| align=left | 
| align=left | Meralco
| 40 || 28.1 || .562 || .286 || .537 || 6.2 || 1.7 || .9 || .8 || 6.3
|-class=sortbottom
| align=center colspan=2 | Career
| 339 || 30.0 || .438 || .264 || .553 || 6.7 || 1.7 || .8 || .8 || 8.7

References

1988 births
Living people
American men's basketball players
Basketball players from Florida
Junior college men's basketball players in the United States
Meralco Bolts players
Philippines men's national basketball team players
Filipino men's basketball players
Power forwards (basketball)
Reedley College alumni
Small forwards
Sportspeople from Pensacola, Florida
Hawaii Pacific Sharks men's basketball players
Southeast Asian Games gold medalists for the Philippines
Southeast Asian Games medalists in basketball
Competitors at the 2011 Southeast Asian Games
Meralco Bolts draft picks
American sportspeople of Filipino descent
Citizens of the Philippines through descent